Jan Radlica was a Polish clergyman and bishop for the Roman Catholic Archdiocese of Kraków. He was appointed bishop in 1382 and died in 1392.

References 

14th-century Roman Catholic bishops in Poland
1392 deaths
Bishops of Kraków